is a town located in Hidaka Subprefecture, Hokkaido, Japan.

As of September 2016, the town has an estimated population of 12,800 and a density of 18 persons per km2. The total area is 694.24 km2.

Climate
Urakawa has a humid continental climate (Köppen Dfb) with warm summers and cold winters. Owing to its slightly more southerly latitude, easterly aspect and location on the sea, snowfall is much lighter than in the major cities of western Hokkaido like Sapporo, Hakodate, Asahikawa and Wakkanai, with the most in one month being  in January 1969. Precipitation in heaviest in the summer months when remnant typhoons may approach; the heaviest daily rainfall being  on 5 August 1981 and the wettest month being  in August 1995. The driest month has been  in February 2003. Year-round sunshine, although less than in the Tokachi Plain, is also higher than western Hokkaido, with the dullest month being 48.0 hours in August 1941 and the sunniest, in April 2014, being 288.0 hours, which beats the previous record of 271.6 hours in May 1957.

Transportation

Rail
Urakawa was served by the JR Hokkaido Hidaka Main Line. Plans to restore this section of the line have been abandoned, due to declining passenger numbers and very high maintenance costs, and the section will be officially closed on 1 April 2021 to be replaced by a bus service.

Railway stations in Urakawa:  -  -  -  -

Culture

Mascot

They are twin horses.
Uraran carries a strawberry. 
Kawatan carries a Hidaka kelp and a Ginsei salmon.

References

External links

Official Website 

Towns in Hokkaido